Asthenotricha sjostedti is a moth in the family Geometridae first described by Per Olof Christopher Aurivillius in 1910. It is found in Kenya, Rwanda, the Democratic Republic of the Congo and Tanzania.

Subspecies
Asthenotricha sjostedti sjostedti (Kenya, Tanzania)
Asthenotricha sjostedti mionoseista (Prout, 1921) (Rwanda, the Democratic Republic of the Congo)

References

Moths described in 1910
Asthenotricha
Moths of Africa